Kim So-hyun travels to the United States alone for the first time through the Lifetime channel entertainment program Because This Is My First Twenty.

Format 
This program features Kim So-hyun's journey as a TV personality, a global star, a 10-year-old actress, and a 20-year-old woman to find her own identity. Filming began in August 2018. A press conference was held at Four Seasons Hotel in Seoul on September 28, 2018.

Episodes

References 

Celebrity reality television series
South Korean drama television series